The Shaft franchise is a series of five action-crime feature films and seven television films, centered on a family of African-American police detectives all sharing the name John Shaft. The first three features may be described as blaxploitation films, the television films are mysteries, and the fourth feature installment is a crime thriller. By contrast the fifth film installment, released to Netflix, is a satirical buddy-cop comedy.

Background

John Shaft

Feature films

Shaft (1971)

John Shaft is a classy and suave African-American detective. He successfully fights local crime, including the leader of the black crime mob named Bumpy, his gang, and black nationals. The conflicting characters have to put aside their differences when they must defeat the white mafia, who kidnapped Bumpy's daughter in attempts to blackmail him.

Shaft's Big Score! (1972)

When John Shaft finds out that a dead friend ran an illegal money laundering scheme out of the former's legitimate business and left $200,000 unaccounted for, he discovers the reason why he had suddenly found himself in the middle of a war between rival gangs. The thugs begin a war of taking over the territory that belonged to the deceased, as well as to get their hands on the missing two hundred grand. Shaft has all he can handle trying to track down the money and, at the same time, keep his friend's sister from the clutches of these dangerous groups.

Shaft in Africa (1973)

John Shaft is persuaded to take on the faux identity of a native-speaking worker in Africa by threats of violence, the enticings of money, and the lure of a potential love interest in his tutor. While undercover he must help in completing a coup on a business that is smuggling immigrants into Europe, and then exploiting them. The villains, unfortunately for him, know he is coming.

Shaft (2000)

New York City Police Detective John Shaft II, son of the 1970s cop, is the lead detective on a sensitive case when a young African-American is viciously beaten to death. After learning there was an eye-witness and upon further investigation, the man's friends lead Shaft on the trail of a man who was known to have racial prejudice, prior to the attack. The titular character confronts him and learns that he's Walter Wade Jr., the son of a wealthy real estate tycoon. He finds evidence that the perpetrator was at the location of the crime. The suspect is released on bail because of 'excessive force' from Shaft during his arrest, and flees the country. Two years later, Wade returns to the U.S. where Shaft arrests him for evading law enforcement. After the judge grants him bail, Shaft questions the magistrate's motives and intentions. He resigns from the police force and sets out to lock Wade away permanently. At the same time Wade fears that Shaft may find the witness before he does and hires a drug lord to find and kill her.

Shaft (2019)

John Shaft III, also known as JJ, is a cyber security expert for the FBI who seeks out a different kind of expertise from his absentee father John Shaft II (and ultimately, grandfather John Shaft I) after his best friend's untimely death.

In discussing the film, director Tim Story stated, "...We’re going to definitely make sure the stakes in the world are real, and then you’ve got these characters who are dealing with kind of a father/son situation, we’re going to see them put a family back together."

Television films

Following the box office failure of Shaft in Africa, the studio moved the franchise to the small screen in 1973. A collection of television films ordered as a television series, the films were released on CBS network television. While attempting to build crossovers with another crime-drama, Hawkins, the series never garnered much success. Each film features a different case and a different crime for the titular character to solve. The series was cancelled after one season, due to poor ratings. Richard Roundtree, who reprised his role from the theatrical feature films, has since expressed his distaste for the television films and their contrasting message compared to the feature films.

Shaft and the Enforcers (1973)
The first film, The Enforcers, aired on CBS on October 9, 1973.

Shaft and the Killing (1973)
The second film, The Killing, aired on CBS on October 30, 1973.

Shaft and the Hit-Run (1973)
The third film, Hit-Run, aired on CBS on November 20, 1973.

Shaft and the Kidnapping (1973)
The fourth film, The Kidnapping, aired on CBS on December 11, 1973.

Shaft and the Cop Killer (1974)
The fifth film, Cop Killer, aired on CBS on January 1, 1974.

Shaft and the Capricorn Murders (1974)
The sixth film, The Capricorn Murders, aired on CBS on January 29, 1974.

Shaft and the Murder Machine (1974)
The seventh and final television film, The Murder Machine, aired on CBS on February 19, 1974.

Cast and crew

Cast
The film series contains four main stars, with various key characters appearing in each individual movie. The following chart organizes the films' stars, arranged by film.

Crew

Reception

Box office performance

Critical and public response

See also
A future descendant of John Shaft appears in the Cowboy Bebop episode "Mushroom Samba", voiced by Hōchū Ōtsuka in the 1999 Japanese version and by Beau Billingslea in the 2001 English dub. According to writer/director Quentin Tarantino, the characters Broomhilda "Hildi" von Schaft and her husband Django Freeman in his 2012 film Django Unchained were written as the progenitors to the Shaft family line and direct ancestors of John Shaft. Tarantino stated that while the film isn't an official prequel to the series, his intention was that the characters have familial ties.

Further reading

Notes

References 

Film series introduced in 1971
Action film franchises
American film series
Shaft (franchise)
Works about African-American organized crime